Dekh Bhai Dekh is a 2009 Bollywood comedy film directed by Rahat Kazmi featuring Gracy Singh and Siddharth Koirala in the lead roles.

References

2009 films
2000s Hindi-language films